Sir Edward Acton, 3rd Baronet (c. 1650 – 28 September 1716) was a British MP.

He was born the son of Sir Walter Acton, 2nd Baronet and succeeded to the baronetcy and Aldenham Park near Bridgnorth on the death of his father in 1665.

He was educated at Queen's College, Oxford, where he was awarded MA on 4 May 1666
and entered the Inner Temple in 1670 to study law. He became a barrister and Tory Member of Parliament for Bridgnorth from 1689 until 1705. He commenced the rebuilding of Aldenham Park in the late 17th century.

He was a freeman in Bridgnorth in 1673, in Much Wenlock in 1676 and in Ludlow in 1697. He held the office of High Sheriff of Shropshire for 1684–85 and was appointed Recorder of Bridgnorth in 1701. He retained his seat in the six succeeding Parliaments, generally voting with the Tories.

Family
He died in 1716 and was buried at Morville. He had married heiress Mary Walter, daughter of John Walter of Elberton, esquire of Somersetshire, on 8 December 1674 and with her had the following children:
Sir Whitmore Acton, 4th Bt. (1678 – January 1732)
Mary Acton (born 1678)
Edward Acton (1681–1741)
John Acton (born 1687)
Sarah Acton
Elizabeth Acton (1683-1738)
Frances Acton (died 29 October 1718)
Catherine Acton

References

Sources

 Robert Walcott, English Politics in the Early Eighteenth Century (Oxford: Oxford University Press, 1956)
 David Hayton, "The Country Party in the House of Commons 1698-1699: a Forecast of the Opposition to a Standing Army?", Parliamentary History, Volume 6 (1987), 141-63

1650s births
1716 deaths
Alumni of The Queen's College, Oxford
Members of the Inner Temple
Baronets in the Baronetage of England
High Sheriffs of Shropshire
English MPs 1689–1690
English MPs 1690–1695
English MPs 1695–1698
English MPs 1698–1700
English MPs 1701
English MPs 1701–1702
English MPs 1702–1705
Edward